The women's 3000 metres steeplechase at the 2008 Summer Olympics occurred on 15–17 August at the Beijing National Stadium, the first time this event had ever been held at the Olympics.

The qualifying standards were 9:46.00 (A standard) and 9:55.00 (B standard).

In the Final, Gulnara Samitova-Galkina of Russia won, with a new world record of 8:58.81: she was the first woman to break the nine-minute barrier for this event.

Yekaterina Volkova of Russia tested positive for dehydrochlormethyltestosterone (turinabol) and was disqualified.

Schedule
All times are China Standard Time (UTC+8)

Records
Prior to this competition, the existing world and Olympic records were as follows:

The following new world and Olympic records were set during this competition.

Results

Round 1
Qualification: First 4 in each heat(Q) and the next 3 fastest(q) advance to the Final.

(WR - World Record, NR - National Record, AR - Area Record, PB - Personal Best, SB - Season Best)

Final

Splits

References

Athletics at the 2008 Summer Olympics
Steeplechase at the Olympics
2008 in women's athletics
Women's events at the 2008 Summer Olympics